Michael Finucane (born 1 February 1943) is a former Irish Fine Gael politician.

He was first elected to Dáil Éireann as a Fine Gael Teachta Dála (TD) for the Limerick West constituency at the 1989 general election, and held his seat until failing by one vote to be re-elected at the 2002 general election. He was then elected a member of the 22nd Seanad Éireann for the Labour Panel, but in 2007 he was not elected to the Dáil or Seanad.

References

1943 births
Living people
Fine Gael TDs
Members of the 26th Dáil
Members of the 27th Dáil
Members of the 28th Dáil
Members of the 22nd Seanad
Local councillors in County Limerick
Fine Gael senators